151 Regiment RLC is a regiment of the British Army's Royal Logistic Corps. It is currently under Army Reserve control.

History
The regiment was formed in the Royal Corps of Transport in 1967 as 151 (Greater London) Transport Regiment, from three territorial transport regiments and consisted of one ambulance squadron, one tank-transporter squadron, one transport squadron, and a parachute sub-unit, 562 Parachute Squadron Royal Corps of Transport (Volunteers). The parachute squadron was redesignated as a general transport squadron in 1978. The regiment was transferred into the Royal Logistic Corps in 1993, and 215 Squadron was disbanded. In 1999, the independent 124 Petroleum Squadron was absorbed.

Structure
The regiment's structure is:
Regimental Headquarters, in Croydon
508 (HQ) Squadron, in Croydon
124 Transport Squadron, in Warley
B Troop, in Maidstone
210 Transport Squadron, in Sutton
240 Transport Squadron, in Barnet
562 Transport Squadron, in Southall
G Troop, in Aldershot Garrison

References

External links
 Official Website

Regiments of the Royal Logistic Corps
Military units and formations established in 1967
Military logistics of the United Kingdom
British Army
Royal Logistic Corps